Tetris is a tile-matching puzzle video game released in June 1984.

Tetris may also refer to:

Games
 List of Tetris variants
 Tetris (Atari), a 1988 version developed by Atari Games, released for arcade and the NES
 Tetris (Game Boy video game), a 1989 version released for the Game Boy
 Tetris (NES video game), a 1989 version released for the Nintendo Entertainment System
 Tetris (Electronic Arts), a 2006 version released by Electronic Arts for multiple platforms
 Tetris: Axis, also known as Tetris in some regions, a 2011 version released for the Nintendo 3DS

Film
 Tetris - The Movie, a proposed sci-fi adventure movie based on the game
 Tetris (film), a 2023 biopic about the game's development and release

Music
Tetris theme
"Tetris" (Doctor Spin song), a 1992 composition based on the game's main theme
"Tetris", an unreleased song by Basshunter

See also